Gina Murphy may refer to:

Gina Murphy in Butcher Boy (band)
Gina Murphy (OITNB)